Renée DuMonde is a fictional character on the television soap opera Days of Our Lives. The role was portrayed by Philece Sampler from 1981 to 1983, with guest appearances in 1984. She is the daughter of Stefano DiMera and Lee DuMonde. Renée is notable for being the first member of the DiMera family to appear on the soap opera.

Storylines
Renée first appeared in Salem, as the feisty younger sister of Lee DuMonde - the evil home wrecker of Doug & Julie Williams. While looked down upon by the Hortons for this reason, she was taken under the wings by Chris Kostichek and Marlena Evans. She eventually warmed to the Hortons through her friendship with Jessica Blake Fallon . Renée tried very hard to be liked, which often rubbed people the wrong way, including the Salem Strangler, who attempted to murder her twice. Renee survived to inform the police that she remembered his cologne - a cologne worn by Jake Kostichek. This helped, along with other clues, link the police to Jake. However, while the "Salem Strangler" was still on the loose, Renée was invited to stay at the DiMera Mansion for protection. It was during this time that Renée and Tony DiMera developed deep feelings for one another.

Renée & Tony began dating, and her sister Lee DuMonde warned her to stay away from him, as she knew they were half-siblings. However, she was afraid to tell Renée the truth, as she didn't want Renée in Stefano's care.  In 1982, Tony proposed to Renée, who accepted. When Renée read Lee's diary she found out that Lee wasn't her sister but her mother, and that her father was Stefano DiMera. Thus, she became Renée DiMera. Renee quickly broke things off with Tony, not telling him the real reason in order to spare his feelings. Marlena offered counseling to Renée over the course of months helping the young girl cope. Especially after Lee just disappeared (in real life, actress Brenda Benet had taken her own life). Renée resented Lee for lying to her, and Lee couldn't bear that and left town, or so it was assumed.

Tony refused to let Renee go, and when she told him the truth he refused to believe they were siblings. Tony blamed Stefano for breaking them up. When Tony tried to leave town Stefano faked a heart attack. Tony later learned that he and Renee were in fact not related due to a confession by his mother Daphne DiMera that Stefano was not his true father, and had the blood tests to prove it. Renee had moved on and was married with David Banning when Tony learned the truth. Despite the evidence that they were not related, Renée refused to leave David.

However, the attraction between Renée & Tony couldn't be denied. Anna DiMera, who was now dating Tony, was very insecure, as she could sense Tony's true feelings were for Renee. David was suspicious and his accusations grew stronger and stronger. Julie was not happy with her daughter-in-law playing games with her son's heart. Renée was becoming more and more like her mother, Lee. She was beginning to show her DiMera colors - especially after going horseback riding and losing David's baby. This led to their divorce, and left David very broken and bitter to the point he wanted to kill her; Julie felt the same.

Renee continued to grow darker, as her DiMera blood took over. Now free of David, she set her sights once more on Tony, but he was still married to Anna - and she was now pregnant with Tony's child. Renee knew the only way to rid Anna from Tony, was to get rid of Anna, or her baby. Renee learned that Tony & Anna would be boating one afternoon, so she created a hole in the boat just above the water line. When Tony & Anna, and their servants got on the boat, the hole was under the water line and the boat sank. Tony saved Anna, but Anna miscarried. Anna told Tony of her suspicions that Renée was responsible once she learned of the hole in the boat, but Tony didn't want to believe it. In a scene famous for its turn of events, Anna summons Renee to her hospital room. Anna threatens to expose Renee, and gloats at having the upper hand. However, Renee has some juicy dirt on Anna - that Anna lied all about her past as in the "white slavery" ring. Anna claimed she was kidnapped because she couldn't swim after having fallen off the boat she had with Roman (her first husband). But Renee wisely pointed out that Anna had no troubles swimming that day the boat sank. She threatened Anna to keep her mouth shut or else she would expose her. It was just one of their many cat fights.

While he refused to believe Renée's involvement, Tony shunned Renée. Feeling lonely and rejected by most of Salem, Alex Marshall swooped in and romanced her. It was a whirlwind relationship and Renee & Alex were soon husband & wife. It was so fast, that no one knew. Alex wanted it that way - because he knew of a second will. One that left everything to Renee - all of Stefano's money, cars and the DiMera Mansion. When Renee discovered the second will, she wanted to throw a lavish party at the mansion to gloat about her newfound position, to which everyone in town was invited.

The party officially began when Renee entered wearing a gorgeous black gown and she addressed the very curious room. They were all promised the "announcement of the year." Well, she delivered on all accounts. First, she announced that she and Alex were married. Tony was visibly upset - he was shunning her, but he still loved her. And Marie Horton, Alex's former love, was upset too. But in a nice surprise to Alex, always one step ahead, Renee out smarted him and called him "scum" and that she would be annulling their marriage, as she had discovered his true reason for marrying her, infuriating Alex. Then Renee told off everyone in the room - all the "itty bitty Hortons", making Julie livid. Renee reserved judgement on the only two people who ever showed they cared - Chris and Marlena. Renee relished going off on Anna, who wanted her out of the mansion. And finally, she admitted her one true love was always and would always be...Tony. She then ran upstairs in a fit of tears and rage, as she finished her diatribe on all of Salem.

A short while later, Tony went to check on Renee and they immediately fell into one another's arms. They talked and admitted their love after years of longing, and to the delight of their legion of fans, they made love. Tony was jubilant and Renee was finally her happiest. Tony excused himself to grab some champagne to celebrate. Meanwhile, Alex confronted Renee and threatened her. From outside in the hallway, Anna eavesdropped. Alex exited and it was unclear if Anna was going to enter Renee's bedroom to confront her. Later, the maid Deliah screamed - there had been a murder. Roman investigated, and discovered Renee lying face down with a knife in her back.

David, Julie, Anna, Alex and Eugene Bradford, among others, were all suspects. It took months to reveal the truth, as Renee was killed over Labor Day weekend 1983. A series of similar murders took place over the months, and the "Salem Slasher" was on the loose. In April, viewers finally got their answer: André DiMera kidnapped Tony, who had gone to the wine cellar to grab champagne, and impersonated him, as he had gotten plastic surgery to look identical to him. When André returned to Renee, she very quickly realized something was off: his cologne was different, as were his hands, and while his voice was the same, his manner of phrasing was off. She announced she was going to get Roman, and André hastily pulled out a knife - laced with poison, and stabbed Renee, who died from the poison - not the knife wound. He then placed a Raven's feather in her hand, which linked the murder to Eugene once the connection was made. This was all filmed and viewers got to see Renee's actual murder. Clearly, this was not in Stefano's plans, as he loved his daughter Renee. He vowed André would die once he delivered all of Stefano's plans. André was known as the "Salem Slasher."

External links
Renée at soapcentral.com

Days of Our Lives characters
Fictional socialites
Female characters in television
DiMera family
Fictional murdered people